"Nitropelagi" is a Gram-negative and aerobic genus of bacteria in the family Rhodobacteraceae with one known species, "Nitropelagi marinus". "Nitropelagi marinus" has been isolated from seawater from the Jebu Island in Korea.

References

Rhodobacteraceae
Bacteria genera
Monotypic bacteria genera
Bacteria described in 2016